2009 Desafio Internacional das Estrelas was the fifth edition of Desafio Internacional das Estrelas (International Challenge of the Stars) with Rubens Barrichello as the defending champion. The races were held on a newly built track that had been designed by race participant Lucas di Grassi. The event was won by Michael Schumacher after he won Race 1 and came 2nd in Race 2.

Qualifying – Top 10 Shootout

Race 1

Race 1 winner Michael Schumacher's average speed was 76.58 km/h.
Race 1 fastest lap was by Michael Schumacher 55.841s (77.81 km/h)

Race 2

 Race 2 winner Felipe Massa's average speed was 77.89 km/h.
 Race 2 fastest lap was by Michael Schumacher 55.461s (78.34 km/h)

Final classification

2009
2009 in Brazilian motorsport